Taste receptor type 2 member 50 is a protein that in humans is encoded by the TAS2R50 gene.

Function 

TAS2R50 belongs to the large TAS2R receptor family. TAS2Rs are expressed on the surface of taste receptor cells and mediate the perception of bitterness through a G protein-coupled second messenger pathway. See also TAS2R10.

See also
 Taste receptor

References

Further reading

Human taste receptors